Fox Hill may refer to:

Bahamas
 Fox Hill Prison
 Fox Hill, Bahamas, a village in New Providence

United Kingdom
Fox Hill, South Yorkshire, a district of Southey ward

United States
Fox Hill, Virginia, a neighborhood of Hampton
Fox Hill Plantation, a historic house in Lancaster County, Virginia

See also 
 Foxhill (disambiguation)
 Fox Hills (disambiguation)
The Tower on Fox Hill, in Rockville, Connecticut